Marino Masè (21 March 1939 – 28 May 2022) was an Italian actor who appeared in more than 70 films.

Life 
Masè was born in Trieste on 21 March 1939. While still a teenager, he joined the laboratory for young actors of the production company Vides by Franco Cristaldi and studied acting under Alessandro Fersen.  He made his stage debut in 1960 in L'arialda, directed by Luchino Visconti, and his film debut in the 1961 adventure Romulus and the Sabines by Richard Pottier. He had several leading roles in the first half of the 1960s, including Marco Bellocchio's Fists in the Pocket and Jean-Luc Godard's Les Carabiniers, then he was mainly cast in supporting roles. Masè was also active in the adaptation of the dialogues for dubbing.

Masè died in Rome on 28 May 2022, at the age of 83.

Selected filmography

 Romulus and the Sabines (1961) as Leno
 The Leopard (1963) as Tutor 
 The Carabineers (1963) as Ulysses
 A Sentimental Attempt (1963) as Piero, Dino's Brother-in-law
 I mostri (1963) as The Lover (segment "L'Oppio dei Popoli")
 Love and Marriage (1964) (segment "Basta un attimo")
 Hard Time for Princes (1965) as Angelo
 Goliath at the Conquest of Damascus (1965) as Phir
 Fists in the Pocket (1965) as Augusto
 Nightmare Castle (1965) as Dr. Derek Joyce
 Gendarme in New York (1965) as Aldo
 The Spy Who Loved Flowers (1966) as Dick
 The Vatican Affair (1968) as Richard
 Commandos (1968) as Italian Lt. Tomassini
 Detective Belli (1969) as Romanis (uncredited)
 The Five Man Army (1969) as Railroad Man 
 Pussycat, Pussycat, I Love You (1970) as Franco
 The Cannibals (1970) as Ismene's Fiancé
 N.P. - Il segreto (1970)
 Lady Frankenstein (1971) as Thomas Stack, the mildly retarded servant of Baron Frankenstein
 The Policeman (1971)
 The Red Queen Kills Seven Times (1972) as Police Inspector
 Il Boss (1973) as Pignataro
 I Kiss the Hand (1973) as Luciano Ferrante
 Massacre in Rome (1973) as Third partisan in Via rasella's window
 The Bloody Hands of the Law (1973) as Giuseppe di Leo
 The Night Porter (1974) as Atherton
 The Driver's Seat (1974) as Traffic Policeman
 Donna è bello (1974) as Mario
 Zorro (1975) as Miguel de la Serna
 Kidnap Syndicate (1975) as Pardi
 ...a tutte le auto della polizia (1975) as Franz Hekker - Francesco Pagano
 Vergine e di nome Maria (1975)
 Live Like a Cop, Die Like a Man (1976) as Rick
 A Sold Life (1976) as Professor Marcelli
 A Matter of Time (1976) as Hotel Forum Porter
 Emanuelle Around the World (1977) as Cassei
 L'uomo di Corleone (1977)
 Standard (1978)
 Assassinio sul Tevere (1979) as Enzo Nardelli
 Play Motel (1979) as Massimo "Max" Liguori
 Contamination (1980) as NYPD Lt. Tony Aris
 The Salamander (1981) as Captain Rigoli
 Il carabiniere (1981) as Gianni
 Cercasi Gesù (1982)
 The Secret Nights of Lucrezia Borgia (1982) as The Duke
 Tenebrae (1982) as John
 King David (1985) as Agag
 The Repenter (1985)
 Voglia di guardare (1986) as Diego
 Il camorrista (1986) as Il faccendiere Sapienza
 The Belly of an Architect (1987) as Trettorio
 L'attrazione (1987) as Victor
 Phantom of Death (1988) as Expert on aging
 Provocazione (1988) as Professor
 The Palermo Connection (1990)
 Senza scrupoli 2 (1990) as Maestro
 The Godfather Part III (1990) as Lupo
 La riffa (1991)
 Venti dal Sud (1993) as Paul Legrand
 Il cielo è sempre più blu (1996)
 The Eighteenth Angel (1997) as Local Doctor
 Il decisionista (1997)
 Doublecross on Costa's Island (1997) as Paolo Bigetti
 Autunno (1999) as Matteo's Father
 Ginostra (2002) as Night Watchman
 Nel mio amore (2004) as Prete anziano
 Quale amore (2006) as Bank director

References

External links

1939 births
2022 deaths
20th-century Italian male actors
Actors from Trieste
Italian male film actors
Italian stage actors